William Hiram Wright (October 4, 1864 – February 6, 1940) was an American professional baseball player, He played in one game in Major League Baseball as a catcher for the Washington Nationals in 1887.

External links

Major League Baseball catchers
Washington Nationals (1886–1889) players
Troy Trojans (minor league) players
19th-century baseball players
1864 births
1940 deaths